The Academia Sporting or Academia Cristiano Ronaldo is the name given to Sporting's training facilities located outside Alcochete, Portugal.

History 
The Sporting Academy was inaugurated in 2002 in Portugal.

The academy was one of the training grounds for the Portugal national football team during Euro 2004. A number of European clubs choose the Sporting's Academia for training in the off-season. The Academy (known as the Academia de Alcochete) was renamed Sporting/Puma Academy (Academia Sporting/Puma) to reflect the sponsorship and naming contract signed by the club and the sports brand Puma in 2006; the contract lasted until 2012.

Sporting's Academy was the first sports academy in Europe to receive the ISO9001:2008. – a quality certification awarded by EIC, a Portuguese anonymous society responsible for this type of reward.

In June 2010, the Sporting signed the first contract for consultancy in sports training at the international level, with Al-Ahli Saudi Soccer Academy, from Saudi Arabia, a partnership that lasted for three years.

On 15 May 2018, after Sporting finished third in the Portuguese league, several players and coaches were attacked by around 50 supporters of Sporting at the academy.

On 21 September 2020, the Academy was renamed Academia Cristiano Ronaldo.

References 

Sporting
Sporting CP
Sporting CP B